Noordwolde may refer to:

 Noordwolde, Friesland, a village in the Dutch province of Friesland
 Noordwolde, Groningen, a village in the Dutch province of Groningen